A broadcast band is a segment of the radio spectrum used for broadcasting.

See also
 North American broadcast television frequencies
 AM broadcasting
 FM broadcasting
 Dead air
 Internet radio
 Radio network
 Music radio
 Old-time radio
 Radio astronomy
 Radio programming
 Types of radio emissions

Bandplans